Victor Vladimir García Campos, better known as Victor García (born June 15, 1995, in Usulután, El Salvador) is a Salvadoran professional footballer.

Club career

Toros FC 
In 2015, García signed with Toros FC of Segunda División.

Águila 
García signed with C.D. Águila of the Primera División for the Clausura 2016. With Águila, García reached the final of that tournament, but they were defeated by Dragón (0–1). García did not play in the final.

In December 2018, Águila left García out of the team.

International career 
García was called up to the El Salvador for a friendly against Curaçao, on 22 March 2017.

Honours

Player

Club
C.D. Águila
 Primera División
 Runners-up: Clausura 2016

References

External links
 

1995 births
Living people
People from Usulután Department
Salvadoran footballers
C.D. Águila footballers
Association football midfielders
El Salvador international footballers
2017 CONCACAF Gold Cup players